Queen Isabella may refer to:

People
 Isabella of Hainault (1170–1190), queen consort of Philip II of France
 Isabella I of Jerusalem (1172–1205), queen regnant
 Isabella of Angoulême (1188–1246), queen consort of John of England
 Isabella II of Jerusalem (1212–1228), queen regnant, also known as Yolande
 Isabella of England (1214–1241), Holy Roman Empress to Frederick II and his queen consort of Germany and of Sicily
 Isabella, Queen of Armenia (died 1252), queen regnant
 Isabella of Aragon (1247–1271), queen consort of Philip III of France
 Isabella of Ibelin (1241–1324), queen consort of Hugh III of Cyprus
 Isabella of Ibelin (1252–1282), queen consort of Hugh II of Cyprus
 Elizabeth of Aragon (1271–1336), queen consort of Denis of Portugal
 Isabella of France (1295–1358), queen consort of Edward II of England
 Isabella of Majorca (1337–1406), titular queen consort
 Isabeau of Bavaria (1369–1435), queen consort of Charles VI of France
 Isabella of Valois (1389–1409), queen consort of Richard II of England
 Isabella of Portugal, Queen of Castile (1428–1496), queen consort of John II of Castile
 Isabella I of Castile (1451–1504), Queen of Spain and wife of Ferdinand II of Aragon
 Isabella, Princess of Asturias (1470–1498), queen consort of Manuel I of Portugal
 Isabella of Austria (1501–1526), queen consort of Christian II of Denmark, Norway and Sweden
 Isabella of Portugal (1503–1539), Holy Roman Empress to Charles V and his queen consort of Aragon and Castile
 Isabella Jagiellon (1519–1559), queen consort of János Szapolyai of Hungary
 Isabella Clara Eugenia (1566–1633), Co-sovereign of the Habsburg Netherlands.
 Isabella II of Spain (1830–1904), queen regnant

Other uses
 Statue of Isabella I of Castile, an outdoor sculpture of Isabella I of Castile, in Washington, D.C., US

See also
 Isabel (disambiguation)
 Isabella (given name)
 Princess Isabella (disambiguation)
 Princess Isabelle (disambiguation)
 Queen Elizabeth (disambiguation)